K. A. Ashok Pai (30 December 1946 – 29 September 2016) was an Indian psychiatrist, writer and film producer based in Shimoga. He was the chairman of Karnataka Mental Health Taskforce.

Ashok Pai started the Manasa Nursing Home and Manasa Educational Foundation in Shimoga.

He died of cardiac arrest on 29 September 2016.

Filmography

Films produced
Pai has produced four films all of which have been directed by Suresh Heblikar:
 Kadina Benki (1989) - national and state awards winning film
 Prathama Ushakirana (1990) - state award-winning film
 Aagatha (1995) - also writer
 Mana Manthana (2017)

Television
Pai produced a series called Antarala which had ten episodes with Girish Karnad as the lead actor.

References

1946 births
2016 deaths
Indian psychiatrists
Film producers from Karnataka
Indian medical writers
Konkani people
People from Shimoga
Telugu film producers
20th-century Indian medical doctors